Cecily Y. Strickland is a justice with the Federal Court of Canada. Before her appointment she was a lawyer at the firm Stewart McKelvey in St. John's, Newfoundland and Labrador. She is a graduate of the Marine Institute of Memorial University of Newfoundland (Diploma in Naval Architecture Technology) and Dalhousie Law School (Bachelor and Master's of Law), now known as Schulich School of Law.

She has ruled in several notable cases.

References

Judges of the Federal Court of Canada
Living people
Lawyers in Newfoundland and Labrador
Canadian women judges
1959 births
Schulich School of Law alumni
Memorial University of Newfoundland alumni